David Snyder is the potential U.S. Representative for  from Carver, Minnesota. The district includes most of the northern suburbs of the Twin Cities, as well as St. Cloud, Minnesota. During the 2016 election, he will be facing the Republican nominee, Tom Emmer. Before expressing his interest as a congressman, he was previously a helicopter pilot in the United States Army, where he attained the Chief Warrant Officer rank.

U.S. House of Representatives

2016 election 
Snyder won the initial endorsement out of defeating potential nominees Judy Adams and Bob Helland by receiving 74 out of 118 ballots. Following the announcement, Snyder raised between $16,000 and $20,000 for his campaign.

References

External links 
Campaign website

Living people
Minnesota Democrats
People from Carver County, Minnesota
Year of birth missing (living people)
United States Army aviators